Andremo in città (We'll Go to the City) is a 1966 Italian drama film directed by Nelo Risi. It is based on the novel of the same name by Edith Bruck, Risi's wife. Bruck, a Hungarian concentration camp-survivor, settled in Italy after the Second World War and wrote about her experiences in autobiographical and fictional formats. The film stars Geraldine Chaplin and Nino Castelnuovo.

Plot
In rural Yugoslavia, Lenka (Chaplin) lives with her blind brother, Miscia (Scrobogna). They were orphaned of their Greek Orthodox mother and their Jewish father, Rasco (Gavrić) is believed to have been killed in the war. As the Second World War continues to rage and fascism activity blights Europe, Lenka and her brother become increasingly vulnerable targets to anti-semitic sentiment. She finds support in Ivan (Castelnuovo), a partisan in love with her. Meanwhile, Rasco returns alive, despite reports of his death. Rasco ultimately sacrifices himself to save the life of Ivan, who lies injured in the family's attic. The SS return to collect Lenka and Miscia, who do not reveal the whereabouts of Ivan.

Cast
Geraldine Chaplin as Lenka Vitas
Nino Castelnuovo as Ivan
Stefania Careddu as Eva
Federico Scrobogna as Miscia Vitas
Aleksandar Gavrić as Rasko Vitas
Giovanni Ivan Scratuglia
Slavko Simić as Dottore Kolarov

References

External links
 
  (German dub)

1966 films
Italian drama films
1966 drama films
Films based on Italian novels
Holocaust films
Italian black-and-white films
Films directed by Nelo Risi
1960s Italian films